Dyrøya is a small island in Øksnes Municipality in Nordland county, Norway. It is located off the west coast of the large island of Langøya in the Vesterålen archipelago. The small islands of Nærøya and Tindsøya lie to the west and the island of Skogsøya lies to the north. The  island has one village, Barkestad, and there are only 4 residents on this island (in 2017). There are no road connections to the island, so all residents must use boats.

See also
List of islands of Norway

References

Øksnes
Islands of Nordland
Vesterålen